Mahmudabad-e Olya (also Romanized as Maḩmūdābād-e ‘Olyā; also known as Maḩmūdābād, Maḩmūdābād Bālā, Maḩmūdābād-e Bālā, Mohammad Ābād) is a village in Mian Jam Rural District, in the Central District of Torbat-e Jam County, Razavi Khorasan Province, Iran. At the 2006 census, its population was 1,102, in 246 families.

References 

Populated places in Torbat-e Jam County